Bargersville is a town in White River and Union townships, Johnson County, Indiana, United States. The population was 9,560 at the 2020 census.

History
Bargersville was established in 1906 when the railroad was extended to that point. It took its name from Old Bargersville, Indiana.

Geography
Bargersville is located at  (39.519928, -86.165570).

Demographics

2010 census
As of the 2010 census, there were 4,013 people, 1,492 households, and 1,055 families living in the town. The racial makeup of the town was 95.6% White, 1.1% African American, 0.3% Native American, 1.0% Asian, 0.4% from other races, and 1.6% from two or more races. Hispanic or Latino of any race were 2.1% of the population.

There were 1,492 households, of which 41.0% had children under the age of 18 living with them, 56.0% were married couples living together, 9.9% had a female householder with no husband present, 4.8% had a male householder with no wife present, and 29.3% were non-families. 21.8% of all households were made up of individuals, and 5% had someone living alone who was 65 years of age or older. The average household size was 2.69 and the average family size was 3.18.

The median age in the town was 33.2 years. 29.2% of residents were under the age of 18; 7.2% were between the ages of 18 and 24; 32.6% were from 25 to 44; 23.2% were from 45 to 64; and 7.7% were 65 years of age or older. The gender makeup of the town was 51.2% male and 48.8% female.

2000 census
As of the 2000 census, there were 2,120 people, 770 households, and 588 families living in the town. The racial makeup of the town was 99.10% White, 0.05% African American, 0.19% Native American, 0.14% Asian, 0.05% from other races, and 0.47% from two or more races. Hispanic or Latino of any race were 0.47% of the population.

There were 770 households, out of which 43.0% had children under the age of 18 living with them, 60.3% were married couples living together, 11.6% had a female householder with no husband present, and 23.6% were non-families. 18.8% of all households were made up of individuals, and 5.1% had someone living alone who was 65 years of age or older. The average household size was 2.74 and the average family size was 3.12.

In the town, the population was spread out, with 30.4% under the age of 18, 8.8% from 18 to 24, 35.0% from 25 to 44, 19.4% from 45 to 64, and 6.5% who were 65 years of age or older. The median age was 31 years. For every 100 females, there were 100.9 males. For every 100 females age 18 and over, there were 97.6 males.

The median income for a household in the town was $48,264, and the median income for a family was $50,417. Males had a median income of $37,139 versus $24,205 for females. The per capita income for the town was $19,499. About 3.7% of families and 4.3% of the population were below the poverty line, including 5.1% of those under age 18 and 1.3% of those age 65 or over.

Education
Most of Bargersville is in Center Grove Community School Corporation, served by Center Grove High School. Small sections of Bargersville are in Franklin Community Schools, served by Franklin Community High School.

References

External links

Town of Bargersville, Indiana website

Towns in Johnson County, Indiana
Towns in Indiana
Indianapolis metropolitan area
1906 establishments in Indiana
Populated places established in 1906